Caloptilia kisoensis is a moth of the family Gracillariidae. It is known from Japan (Honshū), Korea and the Russian Far East.

The wingspan is 11-13.8 mm.

The larvae feed on Acer ginnala and Acer mono. They mine the leaves of their host plant.

References

kisoensis
Moths of Asia
Moths described in 1982